Lato was an ancient city of Crete.

Lato may also refer to:

 Lato (surname)
 Lato (river), an Italian river
 Lato (typeface), a humanist sans-serif font
 Latô (Caulerpa lentillifera), an edible seaweed

See also
 
 Leto